New Grimsby is a coastal settlement on the island of Tresco in the Isles of Scilly, England. It is located on the west side of the island and there is a quay, as well as a public house, The New Inn, and a small art gallery.

The southern portion of the modern-day settlement (on the site of Abbey Farm) has greatly expanded in recent years and is now the centre of the island's timeshare holiday community, which includes the Tresco Estate's "Island Office", the island's convenience store (with a post office sub-branch inside) and a restaurant.

Tresco's other main settlement is Old Grimsby, located to the northeast of New Grimsby, on the east coast of the island.

References

Villages in the Isles of Scilly
Tresco, Isles of Scilly